The CD Single Box is a compilation compact disc box set by the English rock band Queen released exclusively in Japan on 26 April 1991 by EMI Records.

Packaging
The CDs are housed inside a gold embossed flip top box with a 48-page booklet which includes the bio, anthology and song lyrics in English and Japanese.

Contents
The box set has 12 x 3" CD single ('Mini Album' written on the reverse of all sleeves) snap-packs (Japanese: tanzaku) which includes twelve hit-singles released between 1973 and 1986. The singles start with the A-side tracks "Seven Seas Of Rhye" through to "A Kind Of Magic" complete with B-sides. The few non-album B-sides included are "See What a Fool I've Been", "Soul Brother",  "I Go Crazy" and "A Dozen Red Roses for My Darling". The compact discs are 3-inch or (8 cm), with sleeves called snap-packs, as they could be "snapped and folded" into a small square. Almost all of the writing is in Japanese.

All CDs have three tracks each, apart from "Queen's First E.P.", which has four. The set features artwork from the original UK 7" vinyl releases, except the "Seven Seas Of Rhye" (original German sleeve) and "Killer Queen" (original French sleeve).

Disc and track listing

See also
 Queen discography

References

Queen (band) compilation albums
1991 compilation albums